Infant cognitive development is the first stage of human cognitive development, in the youngest children.  The academic field of infant cognitive development studies of how psychological processes involved in thinking and knowing develop in young children. Information is acquired in a number of ways including through sight, sound, touch, taste, smell and language, all of which require processing by our cognitive system.

Scientific investigation in this field has its origin in the first half of the 20th century, an early and influential theory in this field is Jean Piaget's theory of cognitive development. Since Piaget's contribution to the field, infant cognitive development and methods for its investigation have advanced considerably, with numerous psychologists investigating different areas of cognitive development including memory, language and perception, coming up with various theories—for example Neo-Piagetian theories of cognitive development.

Overview

Tabula rasa is a theory that, at birth, the human mind is a "blank slate" without any rules for processing data, that data is added and rules for processing it are formed solely by one's sensory experiences. The modern idea of the theory is mostly attributed to John Locke's An Essay Concerning Human Understanding, written in the 17th century.

Its corollary, nativism, argues that we are born with certain cognitive modules that allow us to learn and acquire certain skills, such as language, (for example the theory of Universal Grammar, the theory that the 'programming' for grammar is hardwired in the brain) and is most associated with the recent work of Noam Chomsky, Jerry Fodor, and Steven Pinker.

If one accepts that nothing is known until learned, and that everyone shares a basic common sense, it appears infants must—to some degree—make some specific ontological inferences about how the world works, and what kinds of things it contains. This procedure is studied in psychology and its validity is studied in philosophy.

Jean Piaget
Through observations of children, Jean Piaget established a theory of cognitive development. According to Piaget's theory of cognitive development there are four stages of cognitive development. 
 Sensorimotor Stage (Birth to 24 Months)
 Preoperational Stage (24 Months to 7 Years)
 Concrete Operational Stage (7 Years to 12 Years)
 Formal Operational Stage (12 Years and Up)

Infant cognitive development occurs in the Sensorimotor stage which starts at birth and extends until the infant is about 2 years of age. The sensorimotor stage is made up of six sub-stages.

Lev Vygotsky
Lev Vygotsky was also very influential in cognitive development theory. His theory included the Zone of proximal development. Vygotsky also believed that social and cultural factors contributed heavily to cognitive development.
Vygotsky argued that development first takes place socially as infants observe their parent's behaviour and try to imitate it. As this imitation occurs, parents will guide their children, correcting them and provide challenges for them. Play is an integral part of cognitive development according to Vygotsky, as it is through this play that children gain confidence in their language skills, and start regulating their own thought processes. 
Through his research Vygotsky suggested that a child's performance differs depending on whether they are solving a problem alone or if another child or adult is assisting them. He refers to this difference as the "zone of proximal development". The theory goes that if a child is learning to complete a task, and a more competent person is able to provide assistance, then the child is able to move into a new zone of development and problem solving. Vygotsky refers to this movement through assistance as "scaffolding" and helps bridge the gap between the child's current cognitive abilities and their full potential.

Erik Erikson
Erik Erikson was a prominent developmental psychologist, who produced a psychoanalytical theory of psychosocial behaviour, showing 8 stages of development from infancy to adulthood. At each stage the individual is set with a potential conflict, and either success or failure at each point will go on to determine the outcome of the psychological state of the person. The first stage of development runs from birth to 18 months and thus covers the infancy period. The conflict which Erikson identified during this time was trust vs mistrust. During this vulnerable point in the child's life,  they are faced with uncertainties in the world and are therefore reliant on their caregiver. If the child receives consistent care then Erikson claimed that the infant would develop a sense of trust. However, if the care received has been unreliable then mistrust will develop, which may result in heightened feelings of insecurity and anxiety, in future relationships.

The development of mental processes

Adaptive nature of cognitive immaturity
Development is typically considered to be something progressive, as we age we move from more simple to more complex structures or behaviours. This causes us to interpret early or immature forms of cognition as incomplete forms of the adult model. This does not always hold true. Immature forms of development can serve some function of their own, as it adapts for the current environment of the infant. For example, infant's relatively poor perceptual skills protect their nervous system from undergoing sensory overload. The fact that infants have slow information processing prevents them from establishing intellectual habits early in their lives that would cause problems later in life, as their environments are significantly different. From this it could be argued that infants and young children's cognitive and perceptual abilities, might be designed to be suited to their needs at that particular time in their lives rather than incomplete versions of the more sophisticated models possessed in adults. 
Hanus Papousek (1977), looked at the concept that learning at an early stage of development may not be beneficial to the infant if it creates overstimulation. In an experiment he conditioned infants to turn their heads to the sound of a buzzer. The training for the task, began either at birth or at 31 or at 44 days. He discovered that infants took many more trials and days to learn the task if they learned from birth than the infants who learned later. 
Infants need stimulation, however, if stimulation is too great than it could distract infants and young children from other tasks, and replace other, more crucial activities to their development such as social interaction.

Attention

Memory

The development of memory in children becomes evident within the first 2 to 3 years of a child's life as they show considerable advances in declarative memory. This enhancement continues into adolescence with major developments in short term memory, working memory, long term memory and autobiographical memory.

Research on the development of memory has indicated that declarative, or explicit memory, may exist in infants who are even younger than two years old. For example, newborns who are less than 3 days old demonstrate a preference for their mother’s own voice.

Perception

Attribution of causality
The perception of causality was initially studied by Albert Michotte where he presented adults with animated images of moving balls. By manipulating the direction and timing of the moving balls (spatial and temporal dimensions) he was able to influence participants’ perception of causality.
	There is contradicting evidence on whether causal perception is innate and present at birth or whether it is a result of perception development. Through research with very young infants, many studies have shown support for the theory that humans are born with the mechanisms needed for the perception of causality
. Recent research has even shown this ability in newborns only a few hours old. However, other studies have shown similar results received by Michotte (1976) in infants as young as 6 months, but not younger 
. These studies support a more developmental progression of abilities required for the perception of causality.

Object permanence
Object permanence is the understanding that an object continues to exist, even when one cannot see it or touch it. It is an important milestone in the stages of cognitive development for infants. Numerous tests regarding it have been done, usually involving a toy and a crude barrier which is placed in front of the toy, and then removed repeatedly (peekaboo). In early sensorimotor stages, the infant is completely unable to comprehend object permanence. Psychologist Jean Piaget conducted experiments with infants which led him to conclude that this awareness was typically achieved at eight to nine months of age. Infants before this age are too young to understand object permanence, which explains why infants at this age do not cry when their mothers are gone – "Out of sight, out of mind". A lack of object permanence can lead to A-not-B errors, where children look for an object at the location where they first discovered it rather than where they have just seen it placed.

Depth perception
Studies in psychology also suggest that three dimensionality and depth perception is not necessarily fully intuitive, and must be partially learned in infancy using an unconscious inference.
The acquisition of depth perception and its development in infant cognitive systems was researched by Richard D. Walk. Walk found that human infants is able to discriminate depth well from an "innate learned" point of view, they are able to discriminate depth from the age at which they can be tested. However, their visual mechanisms are still maturing. Walk discovered that infants are better able to discriminate depth when there is a definitive pattern separating the deeper and shallower areas, than if either one is at all indefinite, and the depth and distance must be of a certain level of distance in order to be successfully distinguished by the infant. 
According to Walk there is a clear development of perceptual behaviour, as with increasing age it is shown that children are able to discriminate between depths more accurately, and gauge more subtle differences between depths.

Physical laws
Largely thanks to the innovative strategies developed by Renee Baillargeon and her colleagues, considerable knowledge has been gained in the about how young infants come to understand natural physical laws. Much of this research depends on carefully observing when infants react as if events are unexpected. For example, if an infant sees an object that appears to be suspended in mid-air, and behaves as if this is unexpected, then this suggests that the infant has an understanding that things usually fall if they are not supported. Baillargeon and her colleagues have contributed evidence, for example, about infants’ understanding of object permanence and their reasoning about hidden objects.

Language

From birth, babies are learning to communicate. The communication begins with crying and then begins to develop into cooing and babbling. Infants develop their speech by mimicking those around them. Gestures and facial expressions are all part of language development. 
In the first three months of life babies will generally use different crying types to express their different needs, as well as making other sounds such as cooing. They will begin mimicking facial expressions and smiling at the sight of familiar faces. Between the ages of 4–6 months infants have a greater response towards different tones in voices, and greater engagement, watching the speaker's face. The child's own language skills develop with larger variation in babbling sounds, and elicit responses in conversation through babbling. From 7 months to the end of their first year babies are able to understand frequently heard words and can respond to simple requests. Their babbling becomes more complex and they communicate with it as if they are making sense, they use babbling to express their desires. Non-verbal communication also develops and actions such as waving goodbye are produced. This is also the period in which babies often say their first word, an important milestone in the child's life.

Metacognition

Self-awareness
The most common technique used in research for testing self-awareness in infants is a mirror test known as the "Rouge Test". The rouge test works by applying a dot on an infant’s face and then placing them in front of the mirror. If the infant investigates the dot on their nose by touching it, they are thought to realize their own existence and have achieved self-awareness. A number of research studies have used this technique and shown self-awareness to develop between 15 and 24 months of age. Some researchers take language such as "I, me, my, etc." as an indicator of self-awareness.

Rochat (2003) described a more in-depth developmental path in acquiring self-awareness through various stages. He described self-awareness as occurring in 5 stages beginning from birth.

Symbolic thought
Symbolic thought refers to the ability to use words, images, and other symbols to represent words or feelings. During the preoperational stage a child's capacity for symbolism increases, this is shown by their increase in language use during this stage. This can also be seen by the way children play with objects, a stick becomes a sword and a box becomes armor. Children in this stage still might not understand that a map represents a real place, and that a picture of food does not have a smell.

Notes
The Structures of the Common-Sense World
Evolutionary Psychology: A Primer

References

Further reading

External links
 Infant education (audio)

Child development
Cognitive psychology